The 2013 Camping World RV Sales 301 was a NASCAR Sprint Cup Series stock car race held on July 14, 2013, at New Hampshire Motor Speedway in Loudon, New Hampshire, United States. Contested over 302 laps, it was the nineteenth race of the 2013 NASCAR Sprint Cup Series season.  Brian Vickers of Michael Waltrip Racing won the race, his third career and final Sprint Cup win, while Kyle Busch finished second. Jeff Burton, Brad Keselowski, and Aric Almirola rounded out the top five.

Report

Background

The track's turns are banked at two to seven degrees, while the front stretch, the finish line, and the back stretch are banked at one degree and are 1,500 feet in length. The track has a grandstand seating capacity of 93,521 spectators. Kasey Kahne was the defending race winner.

Before the race, Jimmie Johnson was leading the Drivers' Championship with 658 points, while Clint Bowyer stood in second with 609 points. Carl Edwards followed in third with 587, two points ahead of Kevin Harvick and thirty-nine ahead of Dale Earnhardt Jr. in fourth and fifth. Matt Kenseth, with 540, was in sixth; seven points ahead of Kyle Busch, who was scored seventh. Eighth-placed Greg Biffle was fifteen points ahead of Kurt Busch and seventeen ahead of Tony Stewart in ninth and tenth. Martin Truex Jr. was eleventh with 493, while Kahne completed the first twelve positions with 490 points. In the Manufacturers' Championship, Chevrolet was leading with 128 points, twelve points ahead of Toyota. Ford was third with 91 points.

Practice and qualifying

Three practice sessions were held before the race. The first session, scheduled on July 12, 2013, was 90 minutes long. The second and third, held a day later on July 13, 2013, were 55 and 60 minutes long. In the first practice session, Brad Keselowski was the quickest with a best lap time of 28.111 seconds. Kyle Busch followed in second, ahead of Denny Hamlin and Jamie McMurray in third and fourth. Earnhardt Jr. was scored fifth quickest with a best lap time of 28.369, 258 thousandths of a second slower than Keselowski. Gordon, Johnson, Kurt Busch, Edwards, and Bowyer completed the top-ten.

Johnson had the second best lap time, but was disqualified because his car didn't meet height requirements, prompting him to start last of the forty-three car field. Kurt Busch, who completed his lap in 28.040 seconds, will start alongside Keselowski on the grid, in front of Earnhardt Jr., Kyle Busch, and Gordon. Edwards, with a lap time of 28.112 seconds, was scored sixth  ahead of Hamlin and Kahne in seventh and eighth. Jeff Burton and Juan Pablo Montoya completed the first ten grid positions with lap times of 28.162 and 28.191.

In the Saturday morning session, Kurt Busch was quickest with a fastest lap time of 28.531 seconds, six-thousandths of a second faster than Kenseth in second. Kyle Busch managed to be third quickest with a fastest lap time of 28.563, 0.032 slower than his brother Kurt. Bowyer and Edwards followed in the fourth and fifth positions. Johnson, Joey Logano, Hamlin, Truex Jr., and Montoya completed the first ten positions. Earnhardt Jr. followed in second, ahead of Kenseth and Bowyer in third and fourth. Johnson, who was sixth quickest in second practice, managed fifth.

Race
The second half of the season started with Brad Keselowski clinching the pole. Jimmie Johnson (who qualified second) was sent to the rear of the field for failing post-qualifying inspection. Keselowski led the first few laps, but relinquished the lead to Kyle Busch, who, in turn, lost it to Kurt Busch. As drivers came into and fell out of the top ten due to pit strategy, both Kurt and Kyle Busch, Matt Kenseth, Tony Stewart, and others took turns at the front.

Stewart led the majority of the last 100 laps, but Brian Vickers passed both Stewart and Kyle Busch with about 15 laps left. The race saw an unusually high amount of cautions, with the 12th of the day coming out with four to go to set up a green-white-checker finish. On the restart, Vickers held the lead over Stewart and Busch, but coming to the white flag, Stewart ran out of fuel. This allowed Vickers to take his third career win over Kyle Busch, Jeff Burton, Keselowski, and Aric Almirola.  Morgan Shepherd, who qualified and finished 41st, became the oldest driver to compete in the Sprint Cup Series at age 71.

Results

Qualifying

1.  David Stremme hit the wall in turn 2 of his qualifying lap, failing to complete it.
2.  Jimmie Johnson initially qualified 2nd, but his time was disallowed when his car was found to be too low during post-qualifying inspection.

Race results

Notes

  Points include 3 Chase for the Sprint Cup points for winning, 1 point for leading a lap, and 1 point for most laps led.
  Ineligible for driver's championship points.

Standings after the race

Drivers' Championship standings

Manufacturers' Championship standings

Note: Only the first twelve positions are included for the driver standings.

References

Camping World RV Sales 301
Camping World RV Sales 301
Camping World RV Sales 301
NASCAR races at New Hampshire Motor Speedway